The United Counties League operates three divisions in the English football league system, the Premier Divisions North and South at Step 5 and Division One at Step 6.

The allocations for Steps 5 and 6 this season were announced by The Football Association on 12 May 2022, and are subject to appeals.

Premier Division North
At the end of the 2021–22 season, three teams left the division:
Gresley Rovers, promoted to the Northern Premier League
Holbeach United, relegated to the Eastern Counties League
Long Eaton United, promoted to the Northern Premier League

The remaining 15 teams, together with the following, formed the Premier Division North for 2022–23:
Belper United, promoted from Division One
Kimberley Miners Welfare, promoted from Division One
AFC Mansfield, transferred from the Northern Counties East League
Sherwood Colliery, transferred from the Northern Counties East League
Wisbech Town, relegated from the Northern Premier League

Newark were renamed Newark and Sherwood United.

Premier Division North table
Prior to the first match(es) being played the Pos column shows alphabetic sequence of teams rather than league position.

Stadia and locations

Premier Division South
At the end of the 2021–22 season, six teams left the division:
Biggleswade United, transferred to the Spartan South Midlands League
Harborough Town, promoted to the Northern Premier League
Hinckley LRFC, promoted to the Northern Premier League
Northampton ON Chenecks, relegated to the Spartan South Midlands League
Peterborough Northern Star, withdrew and folded
Potton United, transferred to the Spartan South Midlands League

The remaining 15 teams, together with the following, formed the Premier Division South for 2022–23:
Histon, relegated from the Northern Premier League
March Town United, transferred from the Eastern Counties League
Milton Keynes Irish, transferred from the Spartan South Midlands League

Premier Division South table
Prior to the first match(es) being played the Pos column shows alphabetic sequence of teams rather than league position.

Stadia and locations

Division One
At the end of the 2021–22 season, seven teams left the division:
 Belper United, promoted to the Premier Division North
 Borrowash Victoria, relegated to the Nottinghamshire Senior League
 Graham Street Prims, relegated to the Central Midlands League
 Hinckley, transferred to the Midland League
 Kimberley Miners Welfare, promoted to the Premier Division North
 Ingles, transferred to the Midland League
 Lutterworth Athletic, transferred to the Spartan South Midlands League

The remaining 16 teams, together with the following, formed Division One for 2022–23:
 Bildworth Welfare, promoted from the Central Midlands League
 Clipstone, transferred from the Northern Counties East League
 Grantham Town Academy, promoted from the Lincolnshire League
 Newark Town, promoted from the Central Midlands League
 Rainworth Miners Welfare, transferred from the Northern Counties East League
 Southwell City, promoted from the Nottinghamshire Senior League

Division One table

Stadia and locations

References

External links
United Counties League The FA Full-Time

United Counties League seasons
9